Zhao Hong is the name of:

Zhao Hong ( 184), a minor leader of the Yellow Turban Rebellion
Zhao Hong (Song dynasty) (1207–1225), adopted son and heir apparent of Emperor Ningzong
Zhao Hong (volleyball) (born 1966), female Chinese volleyball player